Monochroa uralensis is a moth of the family Gelechiidae. It is found in Russia (the southern Ural). The habitat consists of dry steppes close to moist meadows.

The wingspan is about 19 mm. The forewings are unicolorous brown with a darker costa. The hindwings are pale fuscous. Adults are on wing in mid-June.

Etymology
The species name refers to its geographical origin.

References

Moths described in 2010
Monochroa